Kazi Ahmad Hussain (1889 – 14 August 1961) was an Indian politician of the Indian National Congress. He was a Member of Bihar Legislative Council from 1923 to 1928 and a two-time Member of Rajya Sabha (the upper house of the Parliament of India) from 1952 to 1958 and 1958 to 1961.

Personal life 
Ahmad Hussain was born in Koribar village of Gaya District. Qazi Syed Lateef Hussain was  his father.

Ahmad Hussain married Bibi Chanda in 1923.

He died on 14 August 1961.

References 

1889 births
1961 deaths
People from Gaya district
Members of the Bihar Legislative Council
Rajya Sabha members from Bihar
Indian National Congress politicians from Bihar